Ġużè Muscat Azzopardi (1 September 1853 – 4 August 1927) was a Maltese lawyer, poet, novelist and social commentator. He studied in the Mdina Seminary, and in the University of Malta, where he graduated as a lawyer in 1875. He was married to Tonina Fenech, and had three sons Ivo and Ġino, who were both writers, and Anton, a composer.

Personal and social life 

Muscat Azzopardi was a skilful orator, popular politician, famous theatrical critic, versatile journalist and an active participant in socio-cultural circles. He was also a successful lawyer, becoming President of the Chamber of Advocates; he was a member of the governmental Giunta Teatrale. Muscat Azzopardi promoted actively Maltese drama, and was an editor of a number of periodicals, such as In-Naħla Maltija (1878) and Il-Ħabib (1911), and he also contributed to other publications, such as Id-Dawl (1892) and Il-Ħabbar Malti.

Ġużè Muscat Azzopardi was a member of the Council of Government, and also set up the Għaqda Kittieba tal-Malti (which later on became the Akkademja tal-Malti). In 1920 he was elected as its first president, an honour he kept until his death. In 1924 he became the first editor of Il-Malti, the periodical of the said association. For a period of time he was also the examiner for the Italian language at University and in the Seminary.

For his writings and religious activities, he was honoured twice by Pius X, the first time being decreed the Pro Ecclesia et Pontefice, while he was also given the Bene Merenti medal.

In light of his many contributions in prose and poetry within Maltese literature, Franġisk Saverju Caruana called him ‘the Father of Maltese Literature’. His literary works include novels, poems, plays, biographies and translations. His first work in prose was the Life of Saint George (1874), which was a translation from Italian.

Ġużè Muscat Azzopardi was heavily involved in socio-cultural life, so much so that in 1875, when he still was 22 years old, he was listed as Secretary of the Soċjeta Filarmonika Pinto of Ħal Qormi. Five years later,  in 1880, he wrote the verses of the first hymn to Saint George, the patron of his town. He was again President of the said society from 1906  to 1917. His love and appreciation of culture, as well as his versatility, showed clearly on March 26, 1907, when the Banda Pinto performed a programme of funeral music. In his speech, Muscat Azzopardi  addressed Mro. Ġanni Gatt, who composed the hymn mentioned above.

Muscat Azzopardi the novelist 
Muscat Azzopardi was a powerful novelist. In his historical novels Toni Bajjada (1878), Mattew Callus (1878), Vicu Mason (1881),  Susanna (1883), Ċejlu Tonna (1886), Ċensu Barbara (1893) and Nazju Ellul (1909), he uses the past in its historical application. In his romantic style, the story becomes an indication of the future, and the novelist mixes both element of nationalism with an invented story. The binding of history (which requires research) with fiction (which requires imagination) strives to both teach and entertain. Muscat Azzopardi fills his stories with direct narration, since his stories are based on action, description, exhortation and explicit instruction. However, characters can be seen to lack psychological development, so the reader is bound to understand characters through their actions, and not through a developed sense of personality.

Muscat Azzopardi as a poet 
Muscat Azzopardi was also a leading poet, who experimented with the flexibility of Maltese as a means of poetic expression. Most of his poems are found in the ’Ġabra ta’ Poeżiji bit-Taljan u bil-Malti (1876), Ħamsin poeżija bil-Malti (1890) and Ġabra sħiħa ta’ Sunetti bi Studju fuqhom tal-Kittieb Innifsu (1956). His poetry took many valid elements from the surrounding ambience and the social interpretation presented was many a times of direct inspiration to other poets. Due to his ethic sense he never forgot his mission as a literary educator; even his poetry is frequently didactic.

Ġużè Muscat Azzopardi, along with other minor writers like Ludovik Mifsud Tommasi, Richard Taylor, Anton Muscat Fenech, Dwardu Cachia and Manwel Dimech, inherited the poetic testament of Ġan Anton Vassallo that built his poetry on three principal cornerstones: sentimentality, satire and nationalism. The writers named above succeeded in their work of opening up the democratic orientation of the Maltese nation, while they widened their fields of inspiration by understanding more the social structures and cultural modes. They also continued in their literary discussions, always in light of the models of popular speech. The following is an extract from Muscat Azzopardi's poem Il-Baħar, witnessing his peculiar style of writing:

Muscat Azzopardi as a translator and playwright 
Translations by Muscat Azzopardi include Pawlu Xara (1879), L-Għarusa tal-Mosta (1879), Il-Ħalliel it-Tajjeb (1901), Il-Quddiesa (1902) and Storja ta’ Malta (1903)  from Italian and Il-Għasar tal-Madonna (1878), Il-Missal (1918), the gospels according to San Mattew (1895), San Mark (1915), San Luqa (1916), San Ġwann (1917) and L-Ktieb ta’ l-Appostli ta’ San Luqa (1924) from Latin. Muscat Azzopardi wrote many plays, some of them originals, other translated from Italian.

Notes

References 
Maltese Biographies of the Twentieth century, PIN, 2000
Il-Poeżija Maltija, Friggieri Oliver, Malta University Publishers, 1996
1862-1962 Rikordju tal-festi ċentinarji tas-Soċjetà Filarmonika Pinto Qormi, Stamperija, Dar ta' San Ġużepp, Ħamrun, 1962

External links 
Soċjeta Filarmonika Pinto - Banda San Sebastjan A.D. 1862
L-Akkademja tal-Malti

Maltese male poets
1853 births
1927 deaths
Translators of the Bible into Maltese
19th-century Maltese poets
19th-century novelists
19th-century dramatists and playwrights
19th-century translators
19th-century journalists
Male journalists
20th-century Maltese poets
20th-century Maltese novelists
20th-century dramatists and playwrights
20th-century translators
Maltese dramatists and playwrights
Maltese male novelists
Maltese journalists
Maltese translators
University of Malta alumni
People from Qormi
Male dramatists and playwrights
19th-century male writers
20th-century male writers
Italian–Maltese translators
Latin–Maltese translators